The Indian Relocation Act of 1956 (also known as Public Law 959 or the Adult Vocational Training Program) was a United States law intended to create a "a program of vocational training" for Native Americans in the United States. Critics characterize the law as an attempt to encourage Native Americans to leave Indian reservations and their traditional lands, to assimilate into the general population in urban areas, and to weaken community and tribal ties. Critics also characterize the law as part of the Indian termination policy between 1940 and 1960, which terminated the tribal status of numerous groups and cut off previous assistance to tribal citizens. The Indian Relocation Act encouraged and forced Native Americans to move to cities for jobs opportunities. It also played a significant role in increasing the population of urban Native Americans in succeeding decades.

At a time when the U.S. government was decreasing subsidies to Native Americans living on reservations, the Relocation Act offered to pay moving expenses and provide some vocational training for those who were willing to move from the reservations to certain government-designated cities, where employment opportunities were said by the legislators to be favorable. Types of assistance offered included relocation transportation, transportation of household goods, subsistence per diem for both the time of relocation and up to four weeks after arrival, and funds to purchase tools or equipment for apprentice workers. Vocational training was oriented towards jobs in industry and other professions that hadn't existed in rural communities. Additional benefits offered included: medical insurance for workers and their dependents, grants to purchase work clothing, grants to purchase household goods and furniture, tuition costs for vocational night school training, and in some cases funds to help purchase a home. However, not all who accepted these offers actually received these benefits once they arrived in the cities, leading to some cases of poverty, culture shock, joblessness and homelessness among this population in the new, urban environment.

Background
In 1947, Secretary of the Interior, Julius Krug, at the request of President Truman, proposed a ten-year program to provide the Hopi and Navajo tribes with vocational training. In 1950, the Navajo-Hopi Law was passed which funded a program to help relocate tribe members to Los Angeles, Salt Lake City, and Denver and help them find jobs. In 1951 the Bureau of Indian Affairs began expanding the program and assigned relocation workers to Oklahoma, New Mexico, California, Arizona, Utah and Colorado, officially extending the program to all Native Americans the following year. In 1955, additional BIA relocation offices in Cleveland, Dallas, Minneapolis, Oklahoma City, St. Louis, the San Francisco Bay area, San Jose, Seattle, and Tulsa were added. Relocation to cities, where more jobs were available, was expected to reduce poverty among Native Americans, who tended to live on isolated, rural reservations.

Through the first half of the 20th century, the majority of the American population had become increasingly urbanized, as cities were the places with jobs and related amenities. But in 1950, only 6% of Native Americans lived in urban areas.

The plan of assimilation that was followed assumed that mainstreaming of Native Americans would be easier in metropolitan areas and there would be more work opportunities for them there. Quotas were implemented for processing relocatees. By 1954 approximately 6200 Native Americans had been relocated to cities.

Settler colonialism 
Critics have characterized the Indian Relocation Act as one legislative event in a long series of violence and legislation to get rid of and assimilate Native Americans, called settler colonialism. According to this line of argument, the Indian Relocation Act goes along with the Indian termination policy and land theft in which settler colonialism is intricately tied to.

To succeed in occupation of land by settlers, it is argued settler colonialism is predicated on the theft of land of original inhabitants, which in the United States are Native Americans. While the beginning of US settler colonialism witnessed physical violence against Native Americans, it is proposed later efforts to steal land were based on legislation. The Dawes Severalty Act of 1887 broke up communally owned reservation land into smaller, individually owned lots for each tribal member and remaining tribal land not given to tribal members were sold to settlers. This effort was to promote individualistic values on Native American people. As a continuation of the Dawes Act the Indian termination policy further emphasized individual ownership of land and sold more of reservation land to settlers. Over the next decade the government terminated 109 tribes and removed 2.5 million acres of trust land. Related to the Indian Relocation Act, those who moved to cities forfeited their designated allotment, lessening the amount of land for reservations and making it further vulnerable to encroaching settler colonialism. This theft of land from the Dawes Act, the termination policy, and the subsequent relocation program allowed for more encroaching settler colonialism and opened more opportunities for development and resource extraction.

The Indian termination policy directly preceded the Indian Relocation Act and is seen by critics as another legislative event under the history of settler colonialism. It terminated Native American reservations which removed legal standing as sovereign dependent nations. This included an end to all federal aid, protections, and services, such as health care. It is proposed that this policy directly worsened conditions on reservations and for Native American people. For the Monominees tribes, for example, it is argued this caused a rapidly sinking economy, health and education issues, and skyrocketing tuberculosis rate.

Because of this ended support for Native American people, the BIA began a voluntary urban relocation program. Critics described the relocation program as an intentional continuation of settler colonialism to continue assimilation and "get out of the reservation business". Superficially marketed as a job opportunities program, the relocation act was enticing for many Native American people suffering the consequences of the termination policy. While some people volunteered to move, many were pressured to leave reservations experienced what they describe as harassed by BIA officials. Motivations to assimilate were based on disconnecting people from traditional homelands, where Native American people have special relationships to land and ties communities. While an economic and cultural disaster for many indigenous people of the United States, the act was rationally planned and successful for the US. Native American scholar Vine Deloria Jr. describes the Indian Relocation Act as the "Most disastrous policy outside termination ... meant to get Indians off reservation and into the city slums where they could fade away".

Text of the law
The main text of the act empowers the Secretary of the Interior to fund and administer a program for vocational training for eligible Native Americans.

Be it enacted by the Senate and House of Representatives of the United States of America in Congress assembled, That in order to help adult Indians who reside on or near Indian reservations to obtain reasonable and satisfactory employment, the Secretary of the Interior is authorized to undertake a program of vocational training that provides for vocational counseling or guidance, institutional training in any recognized vocation or trade, apprenticeship, and on the job training, for periods that do not exceed twenty-four months, transportation to the place of training, and subsistence during the course of training. The program shall be available primarily to Indians who are not less than eighteen and not more than thirty-five years of age and who reside on or near an Indian reservation, and the program shall be conducted under such rules and regulations as the Secretary may prescribe. For the purposes of this program the Secretary is authorized to enter into contracts or agreements with any Federal, State, or local governmental agency, or with any private school which has a recognized reputation in the field of vocational education and has successfully found employment for its graduates in their respective fields of training, or with any corporation or association which has an existing apprenticeship or on-the-job training program which is recognized by industry and labor as leading to skilled employment.

Section 2 of the act sets an amount of funding for such programs:

There is authorized to be appropriated for the purposes of this Act the sum of $3,500,000 for each fiscal year, and not to exceed $500,000 of such sum shall be available for administrative purposes.

Consequences for Native Americans
In 1960, it was reported that in excess of 31,000 people had moved off the reservation and to urban areas since 1952, with about 30% returning to their reservations. About 70% of them becoming self-sufficient in their new cities. It is estimated that between the 1950s and 1980s, as many as 750,000 Native Americans migrated to the cities, some as part of the relocation program, others on their own. By the 2000 census, the urban Indian population was 64% higher than it had been in the pre-termination era of the 1940s.

Schools offered vocational or on-the-job training to anyone age 18 to 35 who was at least one-fourth Native American. More than 3500 persons enrolled in 322 institutions and job placement was reported at 70% by 1966. Oklahoma State University Institute of Technology reported that 91% of graduates were employed after the program. Students entered vocational programs, including study of more than 100 vocations including electronics, nursing, and X-ray technology, with assistance from the act. Students were provided two years of education, along with transportation, room, board, funds for books and tools, and a living allowance. Overall, the program had devastating long-term effects. Relocated tribe members became isolated from their communities and experienced homesickness. Many also faced racial discrimination and segregation. Many found only low-paying jobs with little advancement potential with the higher expenses typical for urban areas. Scholar Evelyn Nakano Glenn writes that "Native American men were often tracked into low-level, dead-end jobs, and women were directed to domestic service in white households". Many suffered from the lack of community support and lived in urban poverty, poor health, with substance abuse, emotional suffering, and a loss of tribal connection and cultural identity.  Many could not return to dissolved reservations and those who could often found they did not "fit in" with those who stayed behind.

Given the rapid urban expansion of the period, Native Americans often found that lower cost housing was often in areas most likely to be targeted for urban renewal and replaced with office buildings, freeways and commercial developments. This added to the instability of their lives. Redlining often made it impossible for people either to find homes near their employment or to be able to afford desirable housing. Children of relocated workers had difficulty enrolling in segregated public schools and faced the same social discrimination as their parents.

Despite the overly positive declarations made by its supporters, in reality, termination and relocation policy wrought social havoc for Indians generally, and had explicit, negative consequences for terminated tribes.

Native American resistance 
While people who moved from reservations were initially isolated, Native Americans began to form communities through inter tribal communities. These community endeavors included cultural centers, pow wows, and general community support. In addition, more politically motivated cross cultural groups began to form with proximity in cities and a pan-Indian consciousness developed. This resulted in inter-tribal marriages and people holding claims to multiple Indian nations. Similarly, coalitions began to form among tribal communities which would not have existed had people stayed on reservations. Though this pan-Indian identity was important to bridge groups together, it is important to note that tribal differences were still important and did not lead to a "melting pot" of a single identity.

Pan-Indian political groups were unique to cities. First, these groups had proximity to black civil rights groups and provided support for political efforts, such as protests on Alcatraz. In addition, the American Indian Movement was founded in Minneapolis in 1968. This activism included legal challenges to the termination and relocation policy which eventually succeeded. Overall, Native American activism had a large advantage in the cities over reservations, with large coalitions, proximity to other civil rights movements, and a distancing from the BIA.

See also
 Native American civil rights
 Public Law 280, a 1953 law establishing "a method whereby States may assume jurisdiction over reservation Indians."
 American Indian Center
 Intertribal Friendship House
 Cultural assimilation of Native Americans
 Indian Placement Program
 American Indian outing programs

References

External links
 Public Law 959 from Oklahoma State University Library 
 Public Law 959, US Government digital scan
Bureau of Indian Affairs Indian Relocation Records at the Newberry Library

1956 in law
United States federal Native American legislation
Assimilation of indigenous peoples of North America